Julius Klinger (22 May 1876 – 1942) was an Austrian painter, draftsman, illustrator, commercial graphic artist, typographer and writer. Klinger studied at the Technologisches Gewerbemuseum in Vienna.

Early works in Vienna and Munich 

Klinger was born in Dornbach near Vienna. In 1895, he found his first employment with the Vienna fashion magazine Wiener Mode. Here he made acquaintance with Koloman Moser, who later would be his teacher; Moser recommended him to the Meggendorfer-Blätter.

1896 saw him moving to Munich where he worked as an illustrator for the Meggendorfer-Blätter and others. From 1897 to 1902 he was a collaborator to the eponymous Jugendstil magazine Die Jugend.

Berlin

In 1897 he relocated to Berlin, where he worked extensively as a commercial graphic artist until 1915. Together with the printing house Hollerbaum und Schmidt, he developed a new fashion of functional poster design that soon gained him international reputation. In 1912 he designed the poster for the Rund um Berlin air show in Johannisthal. In Berlin he also contributed to Das kleine Witzblatt, Lustige Blätter and Das Narrenschiff humorous magazines.

Advertising campaign for the "Tabu" company 

Beginning in 1918, Klinger designed a comprehensive and noted campaign promoting the "Tabu" company's cigarette rolling paper, that was advertised all over Vienna in 1918/19. Klinger devised a promotional strategy, spanning from small-sized newspaper advertisements to billboards and painted firewalls – construction site fences and winterized fountain paneling were used as advertising space, too.

Nazi persecution 

Being of Jewish descent, Klinger suffered from national socialist harassment.

Probably towards the end of 1937 he designed his last poster for the Ankerbrot-Werke factory. The Jewish-owned company was transferred to "Aryan" proprietors in 1938. (After 1945 legitimate ownership was restored.)

According to Viennese police records, he and his wife were registered as moved to Minsk on 2 June 1942, i.e. deported. Presumably, they were killed the same year.

Literature 
 Anita Kühnel: Julius Klinger – Bilderheft der Staatlichen Museen zu Berlin (Catalogue of the Berlin State Museums), Gebr. Mann, Berlin, 1999

Some of his work

External links 
 
 Dr.Wiles-Worris – Weil's woah is, Der Standard, 12. November 1999
 Anita Kühnel: Julius Klinger – Poster Artist and Draftsman

Notes 

19th-century Austrian painters
19th-century Austrian male artists
Austrian male painters
20th-century Austrian painters
Austrian male writers
Austrian typographers and type designers
Austrian Jews
People from Hernals
Austrian poster artists
Austrian Jews who died in the Holocaust
1876 births
1942 deaths
Jewish artists
20th-century Austrian male artists